A "jihobbyist" (portmanteau of jihad and hobbyist) is a term coined by Jarret Brachman that denotes a person who is not an active member of a violent jihadist organization such as Al-Qaeda or the Somali Al-Shabaab yet is receptive to jihad and radical Islam.

Coining of the term and characteristics of jihobbyists
The term was coined by Jarret Brachman in his 2008 book Global Jihadism: Theory and Practice.  Brachman is the former director of research at the United States Military Academy's Combating Terrorism Center.  He explains in his introduction to the book that he coined the new term to describe people who, without the support of al-Qaeda or other jihadist organizations, come of their own accord to support the aims of those groups. Jihobbyists "are fans in the same way other people might follow football teams. But their sport is Al-Qaeda," he explained in an interview after the 2009 Fort Hood shooting by Nidal Malik Hasan, a Muslim American soldier who showed an interest in jihadist websites and views in the months prior to the shooting. In his book, Brachman says a jihobbyist "may be an enthusiast of the global Jihadist movement, someone who enjoys thinking about and watching the activities of the groups from the first and second tiers but generally they have no connection to al-Qaida or any other formal Jihadist groups."

He explained in a PBS NewsHour interview by Gwen Ifill in January 2010 that a jihobbyist is usually "somebody who cheers from the sidelines as nothing more than a hobby". A few have perpetrated actual attacks as well.

Criticism
The Jawa Report used the term "eHadis" to describe such people, suggesting that it was a better term.

Aaron Weisburd, who founded Internet Haganah, criticized the term, writing:  "The problem is that the term jihobbyist conveys the notion that these guys are not serious, that they do not constitute a threat. In fact what these guys are doing is marking time while waiting for the opportunities and associations to appear that will allow them to become real jihadis."  Brachman responded by saying, in part, "[The term jihobbyist is] potentially useful in that it introduces shades of grey into the discussion: it acknowledges that people can support al-Qaida and wish death upon Americans, without ever 'joining up' officially", and that "The term, 'Jihobbyism,' also runs the risk of creating a false dichotomy between those who 'do' and those who 'talk.' The premise is flawed because 'talking' is a form of 'doing.' It may be less immediate in its consequences, but as we've learned, talking can actually be more dangerous than blowing stuff up: talking can serve as a force multiplier".

Revolution Muslim, a radical Islamist organization in New York City that advocates terrorism both in the U.S. and in democratic countries around the world, while observing, "I would certainly have this phrase directed at me by Brachman and his associates", noted that many in the counter-terrorism field are worried that the term will lead people to underestimate the threat of domestic attacks.

Additional usage
The Jawa Report observed in November 2009 that "jihadis do not exist in a vacuum on their own. They feed off each other, giving each other support, send each other propaganda which reinforces their radicalism, and they egg each other on to transition from... 'jihobbyist' to becoming terrorists."

An editorial in The Dallas Morning News in February 2010 said "something is terribly wrong in our country when lunacy ... becomes a political rallying point.  The same holds true whether it's a group of "jihobbyists" praising the latest attack by Muslim extremists or the tiny weirdo fringe that thinks Timothy McVeigh was justified in blowing up the Alfred P. Murrah Federal Building in Oklahoma City." Evan Kohlmann, in a February 2010 article entitled "A Beacon for Extremists:  The Ansar Al-Mujahideen Web Forum", wrote that al-Khurasani was "once a prominent online 'jihadist'" who was "written off as an eccentric until he blew himself up at a Central Intelligence Agency base in southeastern Afghanistan at the behest of the Pakistani Taliban."

Colleen LaRose, who was investigated for terrorism and was known by the online moniker "Jihad Jane" is one example of a jihobbyist.

See also
Jihad Cool
Jihadi Jake

References

Further reading

Islamic terrorism in the United States
Jihadism
2000s neologisms
2008 neologisms
Political neologisms